Noel Taylor (17 March 1943 – 15 May 2019) was an Australian rules footballer who played with Hawthorn in the Victorian Football League (VFL).

Family
The second of three generations of VFL/AFL footballers: his father was Cliff "Beau" Taylor, and his son was Jason Taylor.

See also
 List of Australian rules football families

Notes

References
 Balmforth (2019), Steve, "Farewell to Squizzy Taylor", New Norfolk and Derwent Valley News, Sunday, 7 July 2019.
 Holmesby, Russell & Main, Jim (2014), The Encyclopedia of AFL Footballers: every AFL/VFL player since 1897 (10th ed.), Seaford, Victoria: BAS Publishing.

External links 

2019 deaths
1943 births
Australian rules footballers from Tasmania
Hawthorn Football Club players
New Norfolk Football Club players